Prisma is a Finnish chain of hypermarkets belonging to S Group. In Finland there are currently 74 stores in 51 different cities. The first Prisma store opened in Jyväskylä in 1972. In addition to food and groceries, Prisma's selection includes a wide collection of clothing, sporting goods, books, toys, entertainment and home accessories.

Prisma's main competitor in Finland is Kesko's K-Citymarket chain. Prisma also has 14 hypermarkets in and around 5 cities in Estonia. The chain has also had stores in Latvia and Lithuania, but they were closed in 2017. On March 4, 2022, Prisma's owner, the S-Group, announced the closure of all Russian operations.

History
In the past, the S Group's hypermarkets differed a lot from each other, as the cooperatives were allowed to choose their own concept. The names Sokos-market and Prisma, among others, were used. The S Group's first hypermarket, at the time called Sokos Market, was founded in 1971 along Tampereentie in Turku, but the following year, Jyväskylä's Seppälä Prisma was founded, and it got its name from a landmark built in connection with the car market, which looked like a prism. In the 1970s, Prisma/Sokos supermarkets were also opened in Kouvola, Oulu, Pori, Seinäjoki and Tampere, among others. The first Prisma in the Helsinki metropolitan area was opened in the Malmi district in 1987.

The current form of the Prisma chain was born in 1988, when the S Group had begun to consolidate its stores under national chains. SOK considered Prisma a successful name, so it was introduced in all of the S Group's hypermarkets. The product ranges and marketing of the stores were unified. At the end of 1995, there were a total of 28 Prismas in Finland.  AS Prisma Latvija was founded on January 17, 2006, as a registered S-group in Somijā. Its share capital was 5,150,800 euros.

Gallery of Prisma stores

See also
 S Group
 Sello mall shooting

References

External links
 Home Page

Supermarkets of Finland
Supermarkets of Estonia
Supermarkets of Russia
1972 establishments in Finland